Stan Ashby (31 July 1907 – 27 August 1988) was a British middle-distance runner. He competed in the men's 1500 metres at the 1928 Summer Olympics.

Ashby was born on 31 July 1907 in Coventry, Warwickshire, the son of William and Ada Jane Ashby.

1928 Summer Olympics
Ashby was one of three British athletes competing in the men's 1500 metres. Although he came third in his heat, a report in the Coventry Evenging Telegraph says "He ran a very good race, gave of his best and was only beaten by two men whose claims to be in the final were overwhelming.".

References

1907 births
1988 deaths
Athletes (track and field) at the 1928 Summer Olympics
British male middle-distance runners
Olympic athletes of Great Britain
Sportspeople from Coventry